Alapin's Opening is an unusual chess opening that starts with the moves:
1.e4 e5
2.Ne2
It is named after the Russo-Lithuanian player and openings analyst Semyon Alapin (1856–1923).
Although this opening is rarely used, Ljubojević (as Black) played against it at Groningen in 1970.

Description
Alapin's Opening is offbeat, but perfectly playable for White. It is mainly used to avoid highly theoretical lines such as the Ruy Lopez, or to surprise the opponent. White intends to play f2–f4 soon. There is similarity to the Smyslov Position (Smyslov–Botvinnik, 1958) if White tries to play something in the lines of g3, Nbc3, d3, Bg2.

However, Alapin's Opening also incurs several problems for White. First, the development of White's light-square bishop, and also of his queen, is blocked, and will require another move of the knight or another pawn move, both of which go against the opening principle to develop the minor pieces quickly. Second, the knight on e2, although flexible, has no control over Black's half of the centre, and will need to be moved again to become more useful.

It is relatively easy for Black to equalise in this opening; for example, 2...Nf6, 2...Nc6, and 2...d5 all equalize, although Black should be careful to avoid being caught by surprise by an eventual f2–f4.

See also
 List of chess openings
 List of chess openings named after people

References

Chess openings